Flesh and Fantasy is a 1943 American anthology film directed by Julien Duvivier and starring Edward G. Robinson, Charles Boyer, Robert Cummings, and Barbara Stanwyck. The making of this film was inspired by the success of Duvivier's previous anthology film, the 1942 Tales of Manhattan. Flesh and Fantasy tells three stories, unrelated but with a supernatural theme, by Ellis St. Joseph, Oscar Wilde, and László Vadnay. Tying together the three segments is a conversation about the occult between two clubmen, one played by humorist Robert Benchley.

Plot
First segment
The setting is New Orleans, Louisiana. Plain and embittered, Henrietta, secretly loves law student, Michael. On Mardi Gras night, a mysterious stranger gives her a white mask of beauty that she must return at midnight. At a party, Michael falls in love with Henrietta but has yet to see her face under the mask. Henrietta encourages Michael to follow a better life although it may mean losing him forever. Henrietta removes the mask at midnight discovering she is now beautiful and that her old, selfish attitude was really the cause of her ugliness.

Second segment
The second story is based on Oscar Wilde's short story Lord Arthur Savile's Crime.  A palmist, Septimus Podgers, is making uncannily accurate predictions at a party for the rich and bored. He tells skeptical lawyer, Marshall Tyler, to avoid a certain street intersection on the way home. The palmist also acts as if he sees more in his hand but does not admit it. Marshall eschews the advice and almost gets shot during a police chase at the intersection. Marshall goes to the palmist’s home. Under pressure, the palmist admits that he saw that Marshall is going to kill someone.

The notion obsesses Marshall, who decides that he must kill someone, anyone, just to get it over with. He comes close to killing two people but is unable to do so. He finally meets Podgers by accident on a bridge one night, and blaming Podgers for his problem, strangles him to death in a rage. Trying to escape, Marshall is hit by a car. The accident is witnessed by the Great Paul Gaspar, a high-wire artist, and it leads without pause into the third segment of the film.

Third segment
High-wire artist the Great Paul Gaspar is haunted by dreams of falling, and in each dream of doom encounters a woman, Joan Stanley, he has never met. These dreams affect his performance as he backs down from the most dangerous stunt, jumping from one wire to another. Eventually he meets his dream girl, who has serious troubles of her own. Paul later decides that he will not let his bad dreams  affect him and that his life is his own. He performs the stunt successfully, not knowing that the woman that he has now fallen in love with is about to be arrested.

Cast

 Edward G. Robinson as Marshall Tyler
 Charles Boyer as Paul Gaspar
 Barbara Stanwyck as Joan Stanley
 Betty Field as Henrietta
 Robert Cummings as Michael
 Thomas Mitchell as Septimus Podgers
 Charles Winninger as King Lamarr
 Robert Benchley as Doakes
 C. Aubrey Smith as the Dean of Norwald
 Edgar Barrier as the Proprietor of the Mask Shop

Production
At one stage the film was known as For All We Know.  Cummings and Field were cast in March 1943.

Deleted segment
John Garfield was originally signed for the segment, but changed his mind. He was replaced by Universal contract star Alan Curtis in his role intended to begin with a half-hour sequence concerning an escaped killer who finds refuge with a farmer (Frank Craven) and his blind daughter (Gloria Jean). This sequence ended with a spectacular storm scene, staged by director Duvivier and photographer Paul Ivano, in which the enraged killer races after the blind girl. The forces of nature spare the girl but strike down the killer. The preview audience raved about this scene, but Universal removed it and shelved it. (The very end of the deleted scene survives in the final print: the killer's body washes up on shore.) To replace the missing footage the studio connected the remaining three segments with new footage of humorist Robert Benchley.

Not wanting to waste the Jean-Curtis footage Universal hired screenwriter Roy Chanslor to come up with additional material and Reginald LeBorg to direct a few new scenes, so that the segment could be released as a separate feature film. The studio insisted upon "framing" scenes wherein the refugee is shown to be innocent of the crimes for which he has been imprisoned, and which allowed a happy ending. The completed film was finally released in 1944 as Destiny.

References

External links
 
 

1943 films
1940s fantasy films
American anthology films
American black-and-white films
1940s English-language films
Films based on works by Oscar Wilde
Films directed by Julien Duvivier
Universal Pictures films
American fantasy films
American drama films
1943 drama films
Fantasy anthology films
1940s American films